The Coming of Amos is a 1925 American silent romantic drama film directed by Paul Sloane, produced by Cecil B. DeMille and distributed by his Producers Distributing Corporation. Copies of this film survive and can be found on home video and more recently on DVD.

Plot
As described in a film magazine reviews, Amos Burden's mother dies and leaves him 50,000 pounds and the richest sheep farm in Australia. He leaves his home for that of his uncle, David Fontenay, who lives on the continent. The uncle, fastidious, tidy, and high in social circles, is distressed by the ingenious and uncouth Amos. Fontenay's friends, with the exception of the Princess Nadia, are amused by Amos. The Princess favors him, however, and Amos woos her, ignorant of the tales of the disaster that befell each of her former suitors. Under the tutelage of the aesthete Bendyke Hamilton, Amos becomes a gentleman so far as externals go and he progresses well with the Princess. Then out of the past appears Ramon Garcia with a threat of suffering for the Princess if she does not redeem a promise made to him. The Princess, fearful of Garcia, puts off his promise until the night of the Rose Carnival. Garcia swears to take her by force on this night if she fails him. To escape Garcia's wrath, the Princess pretends a loss of interest for Amos. Then follow hectic days for the two men and the woman involving duels and hair-fine escapes from death. In the end Garcia is killed and Amos and his Princess bride are united.

Cast

Preservation
Prints of The Coming of Amos are preserved in the Library of Congress collection, Archives Du Film Du CNC Bois d'Arcy, George Eastman Museum Motion Picture Collection, and Cinematheque Francais.

References

External links

Window poster with Ruby Lafayette and Rod La Rocque

1925 films
American silent feature films
Films based on British novels
American romantic drama films
1925 romantic drama films
American black-and-white films
Producers Distributing Corporation films
Films directed by Paul Sloane
Films with screenplays by Garrett Fort
1920s American films
Silent romantic drama films
Silent American drama films